Leptophobia erinna is a butterfly in the family Pieridae. It is found in Peru and Ecuador.

References

Pierini
Butterflies described in 1874
Pieridae of South America
Taxa named by Carl Heinrich Hopffer